During the 1984–85 English football season, Aston Villa competed in the Football League First Division. Graham Turner left Shrewsbury after six seasons to take charge of Aston Villa in the summer of 1984.

Season overview

27 August 1984: Newcastle United and Aston Villa both have two wins from their opening two matches but Stoke City and Everton are still looking for their first point. Paul Walsh scores after 14 seconds of his home debut for Liverpool, a 3–0 win over West Ham United.

1 September 1984: Newcastle beat Aston Villa 3–0 to top the league with the First Division's only 100% record after three games. Crowd trouble interrupts the match between Coventry City and Leicester City at Highfield Road. Peter Davenport scores a hat-trick as Nottingham Forest beat Sunderland 3–1 and Derby County's Kevin Wilson also scores three in his side's 3–2 win over Bolton Wanderers. Earlier in the week, Wilson scored four in a Milk Cup tie against Hartlepool United.

5 September 1984: Nottingham Forest go top after a Trevor Christie hat-trick helps them to a resounding 5–0 win at Aston Villa.

6 October 1984: Arsenal are back on top of the table – a Charlie Nicholas penalty gives them victory over Everton while Tottenham lose 1–0 at Southampton. Liverpool's woes continue as West Bromwich Albion hold them to a goalless draw at Anfield. The last unbeaten record in Division One goes as Manchester United lose 3–0 at Aston Villa. On-loan French winger Didier Six stars on his Villa debut. With Oxford losing 1–0 at Manchester City – their first defeat away from home since February – Portsmouth are now the only side yet to be beaten in the league this season.

27 October 1984: In-form Everton thrash Manchester United 5–0, United's biggest margin of defeat since losing 6–0 at Ipswich in March 1980. Leaders Arsenal are beaten 3–1 at West Ham. Tottenham nail Stoke to the bottom of the First Division with a 4–0 win at White Hart Lane. Leicester striker Gary Lineker scores a hat-trick in his side's 5–0 win over Aston Villa.

10 November 1984: Everton stay top with a 1–0 win over West Ham at Upton Park. Manchester United and Tottenham also win away but Arsenal are held at home by Aston Villa. In the Third Division, Hull City come from 4–1 down to win 5–4 at Orient.

19 January 1985: Arctic conditions decimate today's fixture programme with only 10 matches played across the four divisions. Three survive in Division One – Liverpool beat Norwich 4–0 while Aston Villa win 3–0 at Coventry and Chelsea draw 1–1 with Arsenal. In the Second Division, Manchester City move into the top three by beating Wimbledon 3–0 and a Tommy Wright hat-trick helps Leeds to a 5–0 win over Notts County.

23 March 1985: Osvaldo Ardiles marks his first appearance of the season with the opening goal in Tottenham's 5–1 win over Southampton. Everton beat Arsenal 2–0 to virtually extinguish the Gunners' waning championship hopes. Hat-tricks for Manchester United's Mark Hughes against Aston Villa and John Wark for Liverpool at West Bromwich Albion. In Division Two, Oxford move up to second with a 3–0 win over leaders Manchester City.

30 March 1985: Two goals by reserve midfielder Kevin Richardson give Everton a 2–1 win at Southampton which takes them three points clear of Tottenham, who lose 2–0 at home to Aston Villa. Manchester City's lead in Division Two is cut to two points after a 2–2 draw with bottom club Cardiff. Oxford, Birmingham and Blackburn all win while Portsmouth draw at Shrewsbury.

13 April 1985: FA Cup holders Everton reach the final by beating Luton 2–1 at Villa Park. An 85th minute Kevin Sheedy free kick cancels out Ricky Hill's first half strike and Derek Mountfield scores the winner near the end of extra time. In the other semi-final at Goodison Park, Liverpool twice come from behind to take Manchester United to a replay. The situation at the foot of Division One tightens further with Sunderland's 1–0 win at Coventry the most notable result. In Division Two, a David Geddis hat-trick helps Birmingham to a 3–1 win at Fratton Park which takes the Blues above Pompey into second.

4 May 1985: Many promotion and relegation issues remain undecided on the penultimate Saturday of the League season. In Division One, six of the bottom seven lose, the exception being Luton who beat Arsenal 3–1. Sunderland look doomed following a 4–0 home defeat by Aston Villa. Birmingham and Hull confirm their promotions while Darlington are poised to join Chesterfield, Bury and Blackpool in going up from Division Four.

First Division

League table

FA Cup

League Cup

References

Aston Villa F.C. seasons
Aston Villa